Te Herekiekie ( 1810s – 13 June 1861) was a notable New Zealand tribal leader. Of Māori descent, he identified with the Ngāti Tūwharetoa iwi.

References

1810s births
1861 deaths
Ngāti Tūwharetoa people